Cláudio Zélito da Fonseca Fernandes Aguiar (born 3 February 1975), known as Lito, is a Cape Verdean retired footballer who played mainly as a forward.

He amassed Primeira Liga totals of 224 matches and 41 goals over eight seasons, representing in the competition Moreirense, Naval, Académica and Portimonense.

Club career
Born in Pedra Badejo, Santiago, Lito spent his entire football career in Portugal, playing at nearly every level. He started out with Grupo Desportivo Águias de Camarate in the regional leagues of Lisbon, going on to represent AD Fafe, S.C. Espinho, Imortal D.C. and F.C. Maia.

In the 2003–04 season, at the age of 28, Lito made his Primeira Liga debut, with Moreirense FC. After suffering relegation in his second year he stayed in that level, signing for Associação Naval 1º de Maio.

Aged 32, Lito joined Académica de Coimbra, enjoying his best seasons in his first two years (a combined 17 league goals, including a hat-trick in a 3–3 home draw against C.F. Estrela da Amadora on 4 November 2007). After still being an important attacking unit in the 2009–10 campaign, again helping the Students retain their top division status, he moved to freshly promoted club Portimonense S.C. for an undisclosed fee.

Lito retired in 2014, after one-season spells with F.C. Arouca, Atlético Clube de Portugal (both in the Segunda Liga) and C.D. Pinhalnovense (third tier). He later worked as a manager, with Sporting Clube da Praia in his native island.

References

External links

1975 births
Living people
People from Santiago, Cape Verde
Portuguese people of Cape Verdean descent
Cape Verdean footballers
Association football forwards
Primeira Liga players
Liga Portugal 2 players
Segunda Divisão players
AD Fafe players
S.C. Espinho players
Imortal D.C. players
F.C. Maia players
Moreirense F.C. players
Associação Naval 1º de Maio players
Associação Académica de Coimbra – O.A.F. players
Portimonense S.C. players
F.C. Arouca players
Atlético Clube de Portugal players
C.D. Pinhalnovense players
Cape Verde international footballers
Cape Verdean expatriate footballers
Expatriate footballers in Portugal
Cape Verdean expatriate sportspeople in Portugal
Cape Verdean football managers
Sporting Clube da Praia football managers